= New Invisible Joy =

- Origin: Pittsburgh, Pennsylvania
- Genres: Rock
- Years active: 1997–present
- Label: Goldwish
- Website: newinvisiblejoy.com

New Invisible Joy is an American rock band from Pittsburgh, Pennsylvania.

== History ==
New Invisible Joy formed in 1997 and played locally in western Pennsylvania before they released their debut album, Pale Blue Day, in 2000. The band's name, as they relate it, was created by pointing at words in the Bible at random. They released a limited-edition EP in 2002 which was packaged similarly to a pill case. They planned a 2003 release for their sophomore effort, Trust, but spent additional time recording and mixing the record, which was finally released early in 2004. While there was some major label interest in the band, they did not end up landing a contract with any of the labels. The group toured the East Coast behind the record and opened at local venues for national acts until 2005, then took an extended break while the band members focused on non-musical activities. Rumors circulated that the group had broken up, though they never released an official statement stating such. In 2007 they returned with their third full-length, Kontakt.

== Members ==
- John Schisler - vocals
- Mike Gaydos - guitar
- Evan Handyside - bass
- Brian Colletti - drums
- Phil MacDowell - keyboards (2006–present)

== Discography ==
- Pale Blue Day (2000)
- New Invisible Joy EP (2002)
- Trust (2004)
- Kontakt (2007)

=== Other contributions ===
- WYEP Live and Direct: Volume 4 - On Air Performances (2002) - "Alone"
